Advisor to the President of Iran is an official appointed by the President of Iran with the responsibility to aid him as a consultant.

List

Mahmoud Ahmadinejad 
Mehdi Kalhor, adviser for the press
Abolfazl Tavakkoli-Bina, adviser for commerce
Mohammad-Reza E'temadian, adviser for commerce
Davoud Danesh-Jafari, adviser for economic affairs
Kazem Vaziri Hamaneh, adviser for oil and gas
Mojtaba Rahmandoust, adviser for the war veteran affairs
Sousan Keshavarz, adviser for education
Brig. Gen. Sattar Vafaei, adviser for fairness and service
Mohammad Javad Haj Ali Akbari, adviser for the youth
Mehdi Chamran, adviser for city councils
Brig. Gen. Mohammad Rouyanian, adviser for fuel transportation
Ali Montazeri, adviser for universities
Ali-Asghar Zarei, adviser for cultural affairs
Mehdi Mostafavi, adviser for Islamic culture and foreign relations
Nasser Biria, adviser for clerical and religious affairs

Hassan Rouhani 
 Hesamodin Ashna, cultural advisor
 Mohammad-Ali Najafi, economic advisor
 Reza Faraji-Dana, scientific advisor
 Hassan Namazi, clerical advisor
 Mohammad-Reza Sadegh, media advisor

Ebrahim Raisi 

 Adel Azar, Advisor to the President
 Saeed Mohammad, Adviser in the affairs of free trade-industrial and special economic zones
 Abdolsalam Karimi, Advisor in the affairs of ethnic and religious minorities

In popular culture 
 In Exodus (2020), drama film written and directed by Ebrahim Hatamikia, a President's Advisor is portrayed by Mohammad-Reza Sharifinia.

See also 
 Aide to the President of Iran 
 Chief of Staff of the President of Iran
 Vice President of Iran

References 

Political office-holders in Iran